The McFaddin and Texas Point National Wildlife Refuges are located in proximity in southern Jefferson County on the upper Texas coast at Sabine Pass. The refuges have a  combined  of fish and wildlife habitat.

Texas Point and McFaddin refuges supply important feeding and resting habitat for migrating and wintering populations of waterfowl using the Central Flyway.  Feeding flocks of snow geese have exceeded 70,000 birds at McFaddin.

Dozens of migratory bird species use habitat on both refuges to feed, rest, nest and raise their young.  McFaddin contains one of the densest populations of American alligators in Texas.  Alligators are most easily seen during the spring, but are often visible throughout the summer and fall.

Mammal species native to Texas include the muskrat, North American river otter, American mink, raccoon, striped skunk, Virginia opossum, nine-banded armadillo, gray fox and bobcat.

Large portions of  both refuges are tidally influenced, creating estuarine environments important to a variety of fish, shrimp and crabs, as well as other life forms higher on the food chain that feed on such organisms.  These estuaries are productive communities and are vital to the life cycle of many marine species.  Some of the more commonly sought after fish found in refuge waters include red drum, flounder, alligator gar and blue catfish.

Located on the coast, Sea Rim State Park borders McFaddin National Wildlife Refuge.

References

External links 
 McFaddin National Wildlife Refuge website
 Texas Point National Wildlife Refuge
 
 Fun365Days.com  regional tourism web site
 Partnership of Southeast Texas regional economic development site

Geography of Texas
Protected areas of Jefferson County, Texas
National Wildlife Refuges in Texas